Irnina was the Mesopotamian goddess of victory. Her name additionally functioned as a title of other deities.

As an independent deity 
In the An-Anum god list, Irnina appears among the courtiers of Ningishzida, a god associated with snakes and vegetation who spent a part of each year in the underworld according to Sumerian texts. In the Weidner god list she likewise appears in a context indicating a connection to the underworld. A partially preserved alternate spelling of her name used the sign MUŠ (serpent).

Assyriologist Frans Wiggermann assumes that the reason behind connecting these two deities was the perception of Ningishzida as a "reliable god," which extended to all spheres of his activity - including agriculture, but also judicial proceedings and war. As such he was a god who could secure victory in battle, which was therefore personified as his courtier.

As a title of other deities 
Irnina was an epithet of Ishtar in texts pertaining to the campaigns of the kings of the Sargonic dynasty, though the name could also function as a title of the similar goddess Nanaya and even Damkina.

A syncretistic hymn to Marduk, which otherwise features only male gods, includes Irnina among the deities listed as his aspects.

References

Bibliography

Mesopotamian goddesses
Inanna